A special election for two judges of the International Criminal Court was held during the 8th session of the Assembly of States Parties to the Rome Statute of the International Criminal Court in The Hague on 18 November 2009.

The election had become necessary after two judges elected in the January election were unavailable: Mohamed Shahabuddeen of Guyana had resigned before taking office while Fumika Saiga of Japan had died on 24 April 2009.

Background 
The judges elected at this election were chosen to complete the terms, until 10 March 2018, of the judges they replaced.

The election was governed by the Rome Statute of the International Criminal Court. Its article 36(8)(a) states that "[t]he States Parties shall, in the selection of judges, take into account the need, within the membership of the Court, for:
 (i) The representation of the principal legal systems of the world;
 (ii) Equitable geographical representation; and
 (iii) A fair representation of female and male judges."

Furthermore, article 36(3)(b) and 36(5) provide for two lists:
 List A contains those judges that "[h]ave established competence in criminal law and procedure, and the necessary relevant experience, whether as judge, prosecutor, advocate or in other similar capacity, in criminal proceedings";
 List B contains those who "[h]ave established competence in relevant areas of international law such as international humanitarian law and the law of human rights, and extensive experience in a professional legal capacity which is of relevance to the judicial work of the Court".

Each candidate must belong to exactly one list.

Further rules of election were adopted by a resolution of the Assembly of States Parties in 2004.

Nomination process 
Following these rules, the nomination period of judges for the November 2009 special election lasted from 5 August to 16 September 2009 and was extended thrice until 28 October 2009 due to the lack of candidates from some groups for which minimum voting requirements were in place. The following persons were nominated:

Minimum voting requirements 
Minimum voting requirements governed part of the election. This was to ensure that article 36(8)(a) cited above is fulfilled. For this election, the following minimum voting requirements existed; they were to be adjusted once the election was underway.

Regarding the List A or B requirement, there was no minimum voting requirement.

Regarding the regional criteria, there was a voting requirement for one judge from the Asian States and one judge from the Latin American and Caribbean States.

Regarding the gender criteria, there was no minimum voting requirement.

The regional and gender criteria were to be adjusted even before the election depending on the number of candidates. Paragraph 20(b) of the ASP resolution that governed the elections states that if there are less than double the number of candidates required for each region, the minimum voting requirement shall be a (rounded-up) half of the number of candidates; except when there is only one candidate which results in no voting requirement. Furthermore, if the number of candidates of one gender is less than ten, then the minimum voting requirement shall not exceed a certain number depending on the number of candidates.

The regional and gender criteria could have been dropped either if they were not (jointly) possible any more, or if after four ballots not all seats were filled.

The voting requirements were as follows:

Ballots 
All ballots took place on 18 November 2009. The voting totals were as follows:

References

 Election,2009,11
2009 elections
Non-partisan elections
2009,11